Brickellia huahuapana is a Mexican species of flowering plants in the family Asteraceae. It is native to the state of Oaxaca in southern Mexico.

References

huahuapana
Flora of Oaxaca
Plants described in 2010